Euphoric is an EP by Canadian industrial/electronic music group Delerium. It was released in 1991.

Samples
Euphoric features a few vocal samples from the movie From Beyond as well as a brief sample of the track "The Mission" from The Mission.

Decade features a brief sample from the "Theme from Reanimator" from the film Re-Animator.

Track listing

References

Delerium albums
1991 albums
Third Mind Records albums